Frank Allan Clark (born 11 September 1943) is an Australian former racewalker who competed in the 1968 Summer Olympics and the 1966 British Empire and Commonwealth Games.

References

External links
 
 
 
 

1943 births
Living people
Australian male racewalkers
Olympic athletes of Australia
Athletes (track and field) at the 1966 British Empire and Commonwealth Games
Athletes (track and field) at the 1968 Summer Olympics
Commonwealth Games competitors for Australia